Hovi is a masculine given name and a surname. It may refer to:

Surname
Arlinda Dudaj (Hovi) (born 1977), Albanian publisher
Kimmo Hovi (born 1994), Finnish football (soccer) player
Raila Hovi, Finnish orienteering competitor
Sasu Hovi (born 1982), Finnish ice hockey player
Tom Henning Hovi (born 1972), Norwegian football (soccer) player
Tommi Hovi (born 1980), Finnish professional Magic: The Gathering player
Torger Hovi (1905–1980), Norwegian politician
Tuula Hovi (born 1939), Finnish orienteering competitor
Venla Hovi (born 1987), Finnish ice hockey player

Given name
Hovi Star (born 1986), real name Hovav Sekulets, Israeli singer

Others
"Hovi Baby", song by Jay-Z from his 2002 album The Blueprint2: The Gift & The Curse

See also
Hovis (disambiguation)

Surnames of Finnish origin